Thomas Erskine may refer to:

 Thomas Erskine, 2nd Lord Erskine (died 1494), Scottish peer
 Thomas Erskine of Haltoun, royal secretary to James V of Scotland from 1524
 Thomas Erskine, 1st Earl of Kellie (1566–1639), Scottish peer
 Thomas Erskine, Lord Erskine (1705–1766)
 Thomas Erskine, 6th Earl of Kellie (1732–1781), British musician and composer
 Thomas Erskine, 9th Earl of Kellie (1746–1828), Scottish merchant, landowner and politician
 Thomas Erskine, 1st Baron Erskine (1750–1823), British lawyer and politician
 Thomas Erskine (theologian) (1788–1870), Scottish revisionary and theologian
 Thomas Erskine (politician) (1917–2008), Australian politician
 Thomas Erskine (judge), English judge

See also